Adil El Arbaoui (born 15 February 1995) is a Moroccan cyclist, who currently rides for amateur team AVC Khourigba.

Major results

2019
 National Road Championships
1st  Road race
5th Time trial
 Les Challenges de la Marche Verte
3rd GP Al Massira
6th GP Oued Eddahab
9th GP Sakia El Hamra
 4th Overall Challenge International du Sahara Marocain
 4th Trophée de l'Anniversaire, Challenge du Prince
 9th Fatih Sultan Mehmet Kirklareli Race
2021
 1st Stage 7 (TTT) Tour du Faso
 8th Time trial, African Road Championships
2022
 Challenge du Prince
1st Trophée de la Maison Royale
2nd Trophée de l'Anniversaire
9th Trophée Princier
 2nd Time trial, National Road Championships
 3rd Overall Tour du Bénin
 5th Overall Tour du Cameroun
1st Stage 8
 5th Grand Prix Sakia El Hamra, Les Challenges de la Marche Verte
 5th Grand Prix Yahyalı
 8th Road race, Islamic Solidarity Games
 9th Road race, Mediterranean Games
 10th Road race, Arab Road Championships
2023
 1st Overall Tour du Sahel
1st Stage 1

References

External links
 

1995 births
Living people
Moroccan male cyclists
People from Beni Mellal